Bates Manufacturing Company may refer to:

 Bates Mill — a textile mill in Lewiston, Maine also known by that name
 Bates Manufacturing Company — manufacturers of automatic consecutive-numbering machines; see Bates numbering